Hardacre is a surname. Notable people with the surname include:

F. M. Hardacre (1915–2011), American football coach
Helen Hardacre (born 1949), American academic and Japanologist
Herbert Hardacre (1861–1938), Australian politician

See also
Hardacre Theater, a historic building in Tipton, Iowa, United States
Hardacre Film Festival, an annual film festival in Tipton, Iowa, United States